During 2018, tropical cyclones formed within seven different tropical cyclone basins, located within various parts of the Atlantic, Pacific and Indian Oceans. During the year, a total of 151 tropical cyclones had formed this year to date. 102 tropical cyclones were named by either a Regional Specialized Meteorological Center (RSMC) or a Tropical Cyclone Warning Center (TCWC).

With 151 tropical cyclones, 2018 was one of the most active years on record, also was regarded as the second-most intense tropical cyclone years on record, featuring eleven Category 5 tropical cyclones, according to the Saffir–Simpson Hurricane Wind Scale (SSHWS), only behind 1997. The most active basin in the year was the Western Pacific, which documented 28 named systems. The Eastern Pacific also saw an incredibly above-average year with 23 named systems, reaching the highest Accumulated Cyclone Energy (ACE) on record in the basin. Activity in the Atlantic Basin was unusually above-average with 15 tropical storms developing, despite the El Niño, which would usually suppress Atlantic activity. The North Indian Ocean was also above-average, documented seven named storms, making it the second-most active season in the basin's history since reliable records began. Activity across the Southern Hemisphere's three basins—South-West Indian, Australian, and South Pacific—was spread evenly, with each region recording seven named storms apiece.

The strongest tropical cyclones were  Typhoon Kong-rey and Typhoon Yutu with a minimum pressure of 900 mbar/hPa (26.58 inHg), while the costliest tropical cyclone of the year was Hurricane Michael in the Atlantic which struck Florida in October causing US$25.1 billion in damage. The deadliest tropical cyclone of the year was Tropical Storm Son-Tinh in the West Pacific which killed 170 people in Vietnam and Laos.

Global atmospheric and hydrological conditions

In the Eastern Pacific Ocean, there was an active El Niño. This was one of the primary causes for the Eastern Pacific's record activity in 2018.

In the North Atlantic Ocean, atmospheric and hydrological conditions were generally unfavorable for tropical cyclogenesis. In the tropical Atlantic, sea surface temperatures were cooler than average, characteristic of a negative phase of the Atlantic multidecadal oscillation (AMO). Additionally, high quantities of Saharan dust along with stronger than average upper-level wind shear over the tropical Atlantic created an unfavorable atmospheric environment.

Summary

North Atlantic Ocean

The 2018 Atlantic hurricane season was the third in a consecutive series of above-average and damaging Atlantic hurricane seasons, featuring fifteen named storms, eight hurricanes, and two major hurricanes, which caused a total of over $50 billion (2018 USD) in damages and at least 172 deaths.

The season began with the formation of Tropical Storm Alberto on May 25, marking the fourth consecutive year that activity began early. However, no storms developed in the month of June. July saw the formation of Beryl and Chris, both of which intensified into hurricanes. August also featured two named storms, Debby and Ernesto, though neither strengthened further than tropical storm status. On August 31, the depression that would later become Hurricane Florence developed. September featured the most activity, with Florence, Gordon, Helene, Isaac, Joyce, Tropical Depression Eleven, Kirk, and Leslie also forming or existing in the month. Florence, Helene, Isaac, and Joyce existed simultaneously for a few days in September, becoming the first time since 2008 that four named storms were active at the same time. The season also became the second consecutive year with three hurricanes simultaneously active.

Activity continued in October, with Michael forming on October 7 and strengthening into a major hurricane over the Gulf of Mexico, before making landfall in the Florida Panhandle at peak intensity. A two-week period of inactivity ensued as the season began to wind down. Oscar, forming as a subtropical storm on October 26, intensified into a hurricane the next day, making it the eighth hurricane of the season. Oscar's extratropical transition ended the season's activity on October 31. No systems formed in the month of November for the first time since 2014.

The seasonal activity was reflected with an accumulated cyclone energy index value of 133 units. ACE is, broadly speaking, a measure of the power of a hurricane multiplied by the length of time it existed; therefore, long-lived storms and particularly strong systems result in high levels of ACE.

Eastern Pacific & Central Pacific Oceans 

The 2018 Pacific hurricane season was one of the most active Pacific hurricane seasons on record, producing the highest accumulated cyclone energy value on record in the basin. The season had the fourth-highest number of named storms – 23, tied with 1982. The season also featured eight landfalls, six of which occurred in Mexico. The season produced 26 tropical depressions formed, with 23 reaching tropical storm intensity. Thirteen of the tropical storms became hurricanes, with 10 reaching major hurricane intensity. The accumulated cyclone energy (ACE) index for the 2018 Pacific hurricane season was 316.565 units (201.9725 units for the Eastern Pacific and 114.5925 units for the Central Pacific).

The season started with the formation of Tropical Depression One-E on May 10, which was five days before the official start of hurricane season in the Eastern Pacific. The month of June saw record activity, with the formation of six tropical cyclonesAletta, Bud, Carlotta, Daniel, Emilia, and Seven-E. With five named systems, the record for most June tropical storms, which was set in 1985, was tied. Aletta and Bud both intensified into Category 4 major hurricanes, marking the first time since 2010 that two occurred in June. Tropical Storm Carlotta moved along the southern coast of Mexico, causing flooding rains. Activity during the month of July was below normal across the basin. Although a total of four tropical depressions formed, only two became stormsFabio and Gilma. Fabio's intensification into a tropical storm on July 1 marked the earliest date of a season's sixth named storm, beating the previous record of July 3 set in both 1984 and 1985.

August was an above-average month for the Eastern Pacific, with a total of seven named storms occurring during the monthHector, Ileana, John, Kristy, Lane, Miriam, and Norman. Forming from a July tropical depression, Hurricane Hector spent more days as a major hurricane than any other storm in the basin. It also had the highest accumulated cyclone energy since Hurricane John in 1994. Around the same time, Tropical Storm Ileana paralleled the southwestern coast of Mexico, bringing heavy rainfall to the region. Forming in mid-August, Hurricane Lane became the first Category 5 hurricane to form during the year. Lane brought record rainfall to Hawaii's Big Island, becoming the wettest tropical cyclone for that state and the second wettest in the United States. September saw the formation of five tropical cyclonesOlivia, Paul, Nineteen-E, Rosa, and Sergio. Hurricane Olivia became the first tropical cyclone in recorded history to make landfall on the islands of Maui and Lanai on September 12. Tropical Depression Nineteen-E formed in the Gulf of California on September 19, the first such instance in recorded history. It made landfall in Sonora on the next day, causing severe flooding. Additionally, one named storm formed in the Central Pacific in SeptemberWalaka. In October, Walaka intensified into a Category 5 hurricane in the Central Pacificthe season's third and final Category 5 storm.

October yielded an above-average number of tropical cyclones with three named storms formingTara, Vicente, and Willa. Sergio became the eighth system to obtain Category 4 intensity during the season, breaking the old record of seven which was set in 2015. Rosa and Sergio both made landfall on the Baja California Peninsula during October, bringing gale-force winds and rain to the region before impacting western Mexico. Willa became the season's second Category 5 hurricane before making landfall in Sinaloa, Mexico, in late October. The cyclone brought strong winds to the area where it made landfall and dropped torrential rainfall throughout the region. Tropical Storm Vicente caused severe flooding and landslides in western Mexico at the same time as Willa, compounding the latter's effects in some areas. November featured the season's last system, Tropical Storm Xavier, which dissipated on November 6, marking the end of the season.

Western Pacific Ocean 

The 2018 Pacific typhoon season was the costliest Pacific typhoon season on record, until the record was beaten by the following year. The season was above-average, producing 29 storms, 13 typhoons, and 7 super typhoons.

The season began with Tropical Depression Agaton active to the east of the Philippines. Over the course of two days, the system moved over to the South China Sea and intensified into the first named storm, Bolaven. A month later, Tropical Storm Sanba developed and affected the southern Philippines. About another month later, Tropical Depression 03W formed in the open Pacific and was named Jelawat. Jelawat intensified into the season's first typhoon on March 30, and then the season's first super typhoon. Tropical activity fired up by June, when a series of storms developed, with Tropical Storm Ewiniar making landfall over mainland China. Later that month, Typhoon Prapiroon developed and affected the Korean Peninsula, the first since 2013. Thereafter, Typhoon Maria developed and reached its peak intensity as a Category 5 super typhoon, being the first typhoon to reach that intensity since Typhoon Nock-ten in 2016. Hurricane Hector crossed the International Date Line on August 13, the first to do so since Genevieve in 2014. Systems like Tropical Storms Son-tinh, Ampil, Josie, Wukong, Jongdari, Shanshan, Yagi, Leepi, Bebinca, and Rumbia formed between late July to early August.

On August 16, Typhoon Soulik developed and headed north, until a Fujiwhara interaction with Typhoon Cimaron (which formed later than Soulik) made it head west towards the East China Sea. It later made landfall in South Korea, making it the first typhoon to make landfall in South Korea since Typhoon Chaba in 2016. Cimaron made landfall near Kyoto, Japan on August 23. When Cimaron was nearing landfall, Tropical Depression Luis formed, which made landfall in China and Taiwan. Later that month, Typhoon Jebi developed over the West Pacific and intensified into the third super typhoon of the season.

In September, Typhoon Mangkhut became the fourth super typhoon of the season and made landfall on the island of Luzon in the Philippines. On the same day, Tropical Depression Neneng formed, which later became Tropical Storm Barijat and made landfall in Vietnam. By late September, Typhoon Trami (Paeng) formed, becoming the 5th super typhoon of 2018. It intensified into a super typhoon on October 2, becoming the 5th Category 5 super typhoon. Later on in the month, it was followed by the sixth and final Category 5-equivalent storm of the season, Yutu.

North Indian Ocean 

The 2018 North Indian Ocean cyclone season was one of the most active North Indian Ocean cyclone season since 1992, with the formation of fourteen depressions and seven cyclones.

The season started with ARB 01 which was formed on March 14 making one of the rarest system formed in March since tropical cyclone development stays relatively low between January and March. It caused heavy rainfall in Maldives, Lakshadweep and Kerala. After a two-month gap, another low formed near the Horn of Africa, which later became Sagar. It became unofficially the strongest cyclone to make landfall until it was broken by Gati in 2020. It caused heavy rainfall in Somaliland and local flooding was reported in the Yemeni coast. The storm made the westernmost landfall surpassing the record of Tropical Storm One. A day after Sagar dissipation, another low pressure formed off the coast of Oman which later organised into Cyclone Mekunu. It then peaked as a Category 3 tropical cyclone according to JTWC and an Extremely Severe Cyclonic Storm according to IMD. It caused 30 people dead and heavy rainfall recorded in Salalah, Oman. After that, a low pressure quickly intensified into a deep depression and peaking as a tropical storm made landfall in Myanmar causing heavy downpour. Five monsoonal depression also formed between June and September.

Cyclogenesis continued with Cyclone Daye which made landfall in Odisha state. Heavy downpour and flood mainly in Malkangiri district and its outer bands also caused heavy rainfall in West Bengal. Following with Daye, Luban and Titli both formed in the Arabian sea and the Bay of Bengal respectively, causing heavy damages in Oman and Andhra Pradesh. Gaja on November 10, also formed and caused extensive damage in Tamil Nadu and Andaman and Nicobar Islands. The season ended with Cyclone Phethai causing agricultural damage in Andhra Pradesh and eight dead.

South-West Indian Ocean

January–June 

The 2017–18 season was a below-average season that produced only 8 tropical storms, of which 6 became tropical cyclones.

The season started with Tropical Depression 01U which was designated by the BOM, entered the basin on August 8 however quickly dissipated overseas. After a three-month gap another low formed off the coast of Madagascar on December 27 which intensified into Tropical Cyclone Ava. After that another low formed on the Australian region and entered the basin. It was named Irving by the Bureau of Meteorology and peaked as a powerful Category 2 equivalent tropical cyclone. It dissipated off the coast of Madagascar. A day later after Ava and Irving, a low pressure formed near Mauritius and explosively intensified into a powerful Category 3 equivalent tropical cyclone named Berguitta.
 
Five days after Berguitta dissipation, another tropical depression formed on January 25, it then peaked as a very powerful Category 4 equivalent tropical cyclone named Cebile, however no advisories given by MFR and JTWC because it was formed overseas . A month after Cebile, a tropical depression formed near the coast of Madagascar which then named as Dumazile. It peaked as a Category 3 equivalent tropical cyclone and caused agricultural damage in Reunion Island. Week after Dumazile dissipation, another low pressure formed off the east coast of Madagascar. It caused heavy downpour  which destroyed 260 homes and flash flooding caused additional 630 homes destroyed, its remnants affected Reunion. Month later, Fakir formed east of Réuníon and dumped  of rainfall which triggered landslide and took two people's lives. The season ended with Flamboyan which was the first system to be named by TCWC Jarkata, it peaked as Category 1 equivalent tropical cyclone and dissipated on May 1 without making landfall.

July–December 

The 2018–19  season was the costliest and the most active season ever recorded since reliable records began in 1967. Additionally, it is also the deadliest cyclone season recorded in the South-West Indian Ocean, surpassing the 1891–92 season, in which the 1892 Mauritius cyclone devastated the island of Mauritius.

The first tropical cyclone was an unnamed moderate tropical storm that formed northeast of Madagascar on September 13, 2018, two months before the official start of the season. Two cyclones formed in the month of November, with Intense Tropical Cyclone Alcide forming on November 5, and Severe Tropical Storm Bouchra entering the basin from the Australian region on November 9. Two tropical cyclones formed in the month of December, Cilida and Kenanga. Intense Tropical Cyclone Kenanga crossed into the basin from the Australian region, retaining its name assigned by TCWC Jakarta. Two moderate tropical storms formed in January, Desmond and Eketsang. Five more intense tropical cyclones formed during February and March: Funani, Gelena, Haleh, Idai, and Joaninha. In addition, Savannah crossed into the basin from the Australian basin as an intense tropical cyclone in March. On April 21, 2019, final two storms of the season formed at the same time, Kenneth and Lorna.

Systems

January

A total of thirteen tropical systems of all intensities were monitored during January 2018, of which seven developed further and were named by the various warning centres. As the year opened a tropical depression that was being monitored by the JMA within the Western Pacific, while a weak tropical low existed within the Australian region to the south of Sumatra. During that day, the depression entered PAGASA's self-defined area of responsibility, where it was assigned the name Agaton.  In the middle of the month, Cyclone Berguitta passed very close to Mauritius and Réunion, causing millions in damages and a fatality. The only system to cause significant damage was Tropical Cyclone Fehi which caused tens of millions in damages when it brought severe flooding to New Zealand in late January.

February

The month of February was inactive, with only six tropical cyclones forming. However, Cyclone Gita became the most intense tropical cyclone to affect Tonga since records began. Gita was also one of the worst tropical cyclones to affect the island nation, causing significant agricultural and structural damages totalling in the hundreds of millions as well as a couple fatalities. Tropical Storm Sanba was a system that made landfall in the Philippines, resulting in a few million in damage and over a dozen fatalities. Cyclone Kelvin was unusual in that it maintained a healthy structure over land through a process known as the brown ocean effect, leading to tens of millions in damages.

March

March was an active month with twelve systems. Early in the month, Cyclone Hola formed near Vanuatu causing a few fatalities and later passed by New Caledonia and New Zealand where it caused minor damages. At the same time, Tropical Depression 18U made landfall in Northern Territory, causing tens of millions in damage despite being a weak system. In the middle of the month, Cyclone Eliakim made landfall in Madagascar, causing close to two dozen deaths and an unknown amount of damage. Also forming in the middle of month, Cyclone Marcus was a very intense tropical cyclone that affected the Tanimbar Islands, Top End, and Kimberley, causing tens of millions in damages. Cyclone Iris was a very long lived system that formed several days later, lasting for nearly four weeks as a tropical cyclone before dissipating in mid-April. Cyclone Josie was a system that formed in late March. It affected southern Fiji, causing millions in damages and several deaths.

April

April was an inactive month with only four systems forming. Tropical Cyclone Keni made landfall in Fiji, causing millions in damages. Later in the month, Tropical Cyclone Fakir passed by Réunion, causing millions in damages and a small number of fatalities.

May

May was a relatively inactive month with only seven systems forming. In the middle of the month, Cyclone Sagar affected Yemen, Somalia, Djibouti, Ethiopia, causing tens of millions in damages and several dozen deaths. Several days later, Cyclone Mekunu affected Yemen, Oman, and Saudi Arabia, causing hundreds of millions in damages and close to a few dozen deaths. At the same time, Tropical Storm Alberto caused over a hundred million in damages and a dozen fatalities throughout the Northwest Caribbean and the Eastern United States. Late in the month, BOB 01 caused a few deaths in Myanmar.

June

June was an active month with fourteen systems having formed. In early June, Tropical Storm Ewiniar impacted South China and Vietnam, causing hundreds of millions in damages and over a dozen deaths. At the same time, Severe Tropical Storm Maliksi killed a couple people in the Philippines despite never making landfall. In the middle of the month, Tropical Storm Gaemi made landfall in Taiwan, causing a few fatalities. Late in the month, Prapiroon affected Japan and the Korean Peninsula, killing a few people and causing over ten million in damages.

July

July was an active month with fourteen systems having formed. In the middle of the month, Typhoon Maria caused a few hundred million in damages and a couple deaths in East China. Around the same time, Hurricane Chris killed a person off the coast of North Carolina. Later in the month, Tropical Storm Son-Tinh impacted the Philippines, South China, Vietnam, Laos, Thailand, and Myanmar, causing over a $235 million in damages and several dozen deaths.

August

August was an active month with 21 systems having formed. Hurricane Florence made landfall in North Carolina with deadly flooding, resulting in $24.23 billion in damages and killed 53 people, making it one of the costliest hurricanes to strike North Carolina, and the fourth deadliest to strike. Florence was also the first storm in the turn of activity. In the same month, Hurricane Lane made an extremely close pass near Hawaii after peaking as a Category 5 Hurricane, becoming Hawaii's wettest tropical cyclone on record and the second wettest tropical cyclone in U.S. history, only behind Hurricane Harvey.

September

September was the most active month in the year at 23 tropical cyclones, including Hurricane Walaka, the second most intense in the Central Pacific on record and Typhoon Mangkhut as the third most intense worldwide of the year. Typhoon Kong-rey along with Hurricane Walaka both were Category 5 tropical cyclones on the Saffir–Simpson scale simultaneously in the Northern Hemisphere, marking the first time since 2005 that this rare occurrence happened. In the Atlantic, a turning point in the activity was also to be seen, with the 2018 Atlantic hurricane season to be the second Atlantic season in a row to see three hurricanes active at once on September 13.

October 

October was an active month of the year but less so than previous months at 11 tropical cyclones. Typhoon Yutu became the strongest tropical cyclone in 2018, neck-to-neck with Typhoon Kong-rey. Hurricane Michael caused $25.1 billion in damage after making landfall on the Florida Panhandle, becoming the third most intense hurricane to make landfall in the Continental United States in terms of minimum pressure. Cyclonic Storms Luban and Titli caused extensive damage throughout countries of Yemen and India, also becoming the first pair of tropical cyclones ever recorded to be active in both the Arabian Sea and Bay of Bengal simultaneously. Hurricane Willa also became the closest Category 5 to Mexico since Patricia.

November

November featured 10 tropical cyclones. Cyclone Gaja made landfall in South India, resulting in about 60 fatalities.

December

December was an active month with 13 tropical cyclones forming. Cyclone Cilida intensified into an Intense Tropical Cyclone, while never directly making landfall.

Global effects

Notes
1 Only systems that formed either on or after January 1, 2018 are counted in the seasonal totals.
2 Only systems that formed either before or on December 31, 2018 are counted in the seasonal totals.3 The wind speeds for this tropical cyclone/basin are based on the IMD Scale which uses 3-minute sustained winds.–4 The wind speeds for this tropical cyclone/basin are based on the Saffir–Simpson scale which uses 1-minute sustained winds.5 The wind speeds for this tropical cyclone are based on Météo-France which uses gust winds.
6 04F formed as a tropical low in the Australian region on December 28 before crossing into the South Pacific basin on December 31. This system was later named Mona in January 2019 and thus only counts for that year.
7 36W was the last tropical depression to form in the 2018 Pacific typhoon season. It was later named Pabuk on January 1, 2019, and as such only counts for that year.

See also

 Tropical cyclones by year
 List of earthquakes in 2018
 Tornadoes of 2018
 2018 wildfire season
 2018 Kerala floods
 2018 Japan floods

Notes

References

External links

Regional specialized meteorological centers
 US National Hurricane Center – North Atlantic, Eastern Pacific
 Central Pacific Hurricane Center – Central Pacific
 Japan Meteorological Agency – NW Pacific
 India Meteorological Department – Bay of Bengal and the Arabian Sea
 Météo-France – La Reunion – South Indian Ocean from 30°E to 90°E
 Fiji Meteorological Service – South Pacific west of 160°E, north of 25° S

Tropical cyclone warning centers
 Meteorology, Climatology, and Geophysical Agency of Indonesia – South Indian Ocean from 90°E to 141°E, generally north of 10°S
 Australian Bureau of Meteorology (TCWC's Perth, Darwin & Brisbane) – South Indian Ocean & South Pacific Ocean from 90°E to 160°E, generally south of 10°S
 Papua New Guinea National Weather Service – South Pacific Ocean from 141°E to 160°E, generally north of 10°S
 Meteorological Service of New Zealand Limited – South Pacific west of 160°E, south of 25°S

 
Tropical cyclones by year
2018 Atlantic hurricane season
2018 Pacific hurricane season
2018 Pacific typhoon season
2018 North Indian Ocean cyclone season
2017–18 Australian region cyclone season
2018–19 Australian region cyclone season
2017–18 South Pacific cyclone season
2018–19 South Pacific cyclone season
2017–18 South-West Indian Ocean cyclone season
2018–19 South-West Indian Ocean cyclone season
2018-related lists